Nikola Jakimovski (born 26 February 1990) is a Macedonian footballer who plays as a left back. He had previously played for Italian Serie B and C clubs such as Varese, Como, Bari, Vicenza, and Bisceglie.

Club career
Born in Skopje (hometown Kriva Palanka), Jakimovski is a product of FK Makedonija Gjorče Petrov youth system. He joined their first team in the 2008–09 season, competing in the Macedonian First League. In 2010, he signed with Hungarian Ferencvárosi TC but after not having many chances he ended up loaned in the second half of the 2010–11 season to Macedonian top league FK Teteks. On 24 August 2011 he signed a contract with Serbian club FK Javor Ivanjica.

Ferencvárosi TC

Jakimovski only played one match on Ferencváros' side. He came in as a late substitute in a game against Győri ETO, that Ferencvárosi TC won by 3:0 .

Nagoya Grampus
On 12 December 2012 Nikola Jakimovski signed a contract with Japanese club Nagoya Grampus. He made his debut on in Nagoya Grampus' one all draw against Júbilo Iwata on 2 March 2013.

Jagodina
At the end of 2013 he returned to Europe, after a year with Nagoya Grampus, Jakimovski moved to Serbian SuperLiga side FK Jagodina on loan.

Italian Serie B
In January 2015 he signed a 6-months contract with Italian Serie B side Varese and got the shirt number 32. Following the team bankruptcy in summer 2015 he remain unattached till 
3 September 2015, when he was free to sign with Como, becoming first Macedonian player to play for the team.

International career
Nikola Jakimovski is eligible to represent North Macedonia and Bulgaria at international level. He represent Macedonia at under-17 and under-19 levels, and has been part of the Macedonian U-21 team from 2011 to 2012.

On 1 October 2015 Bulgaria manager Ivaylo Petev prepare a call up for Jakimovski.

Club statistics

References

External links

Nikola Jakimovski at Tempó Fradi

1990 births
Living people
People from Kriva Palanka
Association football fullbacks
Macedonian footballers
North Macedonia youth international footballers
North Macedonia under-21 international footballers
FK Makedonija Gjorče Petrov players
Ferencvárosi TC footballers
FK Teteks players
FK Javor Ivanjica players
Nagoya Grampus players
FK Jagodina players
S.S.D. Varese Calcio players
Como 1907 players
S.S.C. Bari players
Benevento Calcio players
L.R. Vicenza players
A.S. Bisceglie Calcio 1913 players
Athlitiki Enosi Larissa F.C. players
Trapani Calcio players
Macedonian First Football League players
Nemzeti Bajnokság I players
Serbian SuperLiga players
J1 League players
Serie B players
Serie C players
Super League Greece players
Macedonian expatriate footballers
Expatriate footballers in Hungary
Macedonian expatriate sportspeople in Hungary
Expatriate footballers in Serbia
Macedonian expatriate sportspeople in Serbia
Expatriate footballers in Japan
Macedonian expatriate sportspeople in Japan
Expatriate footballers in Italy
Macedonian expatriate sportspeople in Italy
Expatriate footballers in Greece
Macedonian expatriate sportspeople in Greece